Hesar-e Kordha (also Romanized as Ḩeşār-e Kordhā; also known as Ḩeşār and Hisār) is a village in Ruin Rural District, in the Central District of Esfarayen County, North Khorasan Province, Iran. At the 2006 census, its population was 157, in 30 families.

References 

Populated places in Esfarayen County